In mathematics, the qualitative theory of differential equations studies the behavior of differential equations by means other than finding their solutions. It originated from the works of Henri Poincaré and Aleksandr Lyapunov. There are relatively few differential equations that can be solved explicitly, but using tools from analysis and topology, one can "solve" them in the qualitative sense, obtaining information about their properties.

References

Further reading
Viktor Vladimirovich Nemytskii, Vyacheslav Stepanov, Qualitative theory of differential equations, Princeton University Press, Princeton, 1960.

Original references
Henri Poincaré, "Mémoire sur les courbes définies par une équation différentielle", Journal de Mathématiques Pures et Appliquées (1881, in French)
 (it was translated from the original Russian into French and then into this English version, the original is from the year 1892)

Differential equations